Nikol Marián González Alarcón (born 29 March 1999) is a Venezuelan footballer who plays as a defender for American college West Alabama Tigers. She has been a member of the Venezuela women's national team. She graduated from University of West Alabama in 2021.

International career
González represented Venezuela at the 2014 Summer Youth Olympics and two FIFA U-17 Women's World Cup editions (2014 and 2016). At senior level, she played the 2014 Central American and Caribbean Games.

References

External links

1999 births
Living people
Women's association football defenders
Women's association football midfielders
Venezuelan women's footballers
Sportspeople from Valencia, Venezuela
Venezuela women's international footballers
Competitors at the 2014 Central American and Caribbean Games
Olympic silver medalists for Venezuela
Footballers at the 2014 Summer Youth Olympics
Tyler Apaches women's soccer players
West Alabama Tigers women's soccer players
Venezuelan expatriate women's footballers
Venezuelan expatriate sportspeople in the United States
Expatriate women's soccer players in the United States
21st-century Venezuelan women